= Donewadi =

Dhonewadi
- Village
- Country: India
- State: Karnataka
- District: Belgaum
- Talukas: Nipani

Languages
  - Official: Kannada
- Time zone: UTC+5:30 (IST)
- Postal code: 591263

Donewadi is a village in Belgaum district in the southern state of Karnataka, India. It is famous for agriculture, especially Sugarcane, Tobacco and Roses. The lifestyle and economics of the village changed due to valuable efforts taken by the farmers living in the village. Goddess Laxmi is worshipped by all the farmers daily.

Shri Laxmi Prasanna. Kindly visit to seek Darshana and Blessings of Goddess Laxmi for Peace. The yatra taking place on immediate Friday after Chaitra Poornima (April mostly)
